Upware South Pit is a  geological Site of Special Scientific Interest (SSSI) north of Upware in Cambridgeshire. It is a Geological Conservation Review site.

This site has rocks dating to the Oxfordian stage, around 160 million years ago. It was then a coral reef, and has fossils of bivalves and ammonites, as well as corals, which show affinities with the fauna of the Tethys Ocean. It is described by Natural England as a key site in study of the Oxfordian.

There is access to the site from the Fen Rivers Way north of Upware. A small area of pasture in the north of the site, which is not open to the public, is also part of the Cam Washes biological SSSI.

References

Sites of Special Scientific Interest in Cambridgeshire
Geological Conservation Review sites
Wicken, Cambridgeshire